Special Education is a 1977 Yugoslav drama directed by Goran Marković. It was his first feature film. The screenplay was written by Marković and Miroslav Simić.

The film was finished short before 1977, but it was first screened in 1977, at the Pula Film Festival. Ljubiša Samardžić was awarded the Big Golden Arena, for his role of policeman Cane. The film received the first prize at the Mannheim Film Festival. It was a critical and commercial success.

Cast

References

External links 

Yugoslav drama films
Serbian drama films
1977 films
Films directed by Goran Marković
Films set in Belgrade
Films shot in Belgrade